Mayckol Guaipe (born August 11, 1990) is a Venezuelan former professional baseball pitcher. He played in Major League Baseball (MLB) for the Seattle Mariners.

Career

Seattle Mariners
Guaipe was signed by the Seattle Mariners as an undrafted free agent in 2006. The Mariners added Guaipe to their 40-man roster on November 20, 2014. He made his major league debut against the New York Yankees in relief of Félix Hernández at Safeco Field on June 1, 2015, retiring all seven batters he faced and recording two strikeouts. He would be optioned back down to the Tacoma Rainiers on June 2.

The Mariners released Guaipe on August 4, 2016. He resigned on a minor league deal on August 6, 2016. He elected free agency on November 7, 2016.

Chicago White Sox
On January 27, 2017, the Chicago White Sox signed Guaipe as a free agent. He was released on March 26, 2017.

Rockland Boulders
On May 4, 2017, Guaipe signed with the Rockland Boulders of the Can-Am League.

Rojos del Águila de Veracruz
He left the team on June 26, 2017 to sign with the Rojos del Águila de Veracruz of the Mexican Baseball League. Guaipe later re-signed with the Rockland Boulders on August 20, 2017.

Generales de Durango
On May 5, 2018, Guaipe signed with the Generales de Durango of the Mexican Baseball League. He was released on July 26, 2019. 

After the 2019 season, he played for Caribes de Anzoátegui of the Liga Venezolana de Béisbol Profesional(LVMP). He has also played for Venezuela in the 2020 Caribbean Series.

After the 2020 season, he played for Caribes of the LVMP. He has also played for Venezuela in the 2021 Caribbean Series.

See also
 List of Major League Baseball players from Venezuela

References

External links

1990 births
Living people
Arizona League Mariners players
Caribes de Anzoátegui players
Clinton LumberKings players
Everett AquaSox players
Generales de Durango players
High Desert Mavericks players
Jackson Generals (Southern League) players
Major League Baseball pitchers
Major League Baseball players from Venezuela
Mexican League baseball pitchers
Pulaski Mariners players
Seattle Mariners players
Tacoma Rainiers players
Rojos del Águila de Veracruz players
Rockland Boulders players
Venezuelan expatriate baseball players in Mexico
Venezuelan expatriate baseball players in the United States
Venezuelan Summer League Mariners players
People from Barcelona, Venezuela